The Women's long jump athletics events for the 2020 Summer Paralympics took place at the Tokyo National Stadium from August 27 to September 3, 2021. A total of 8 events were contested in this discipline.

Schedule

Medal summary
The following is a summary of the medals awarded across all long jump events.

Results

T11

Records

Prior to this competition, the existing world, Paralympic, and area records were as follows:

Results

The final in this classification took place on 27 August 2021, at 9:30:

T12

Records

Prior to this competition, the existing world, Paralympic, and area records were as follows:

Results

The final in this classification took place on 29 August 2021, at 9:30:

T20

Records

Prior to this competition, the existing world, Paralympic, and area records were as follows:

Results

The final in this classification took place on 3 September 2021, at 19:00:

T37

Records

Prior to this competition, the existing world, Paralympic, and area records were as follows:

Results

The final in this classification took place on 29 August 2021, at 19:12:

T38

Records

Prior to this competition, the existing world, Paralympic, and area records were as follows:

Results

The final in this classification took place on 31 August 2021, at 19:00:

T47

Records

Prior to this competition, the existing world, Paralympic, and area records were as follows:

Results

The final in this classification took place on 3 September 2021, at 9:35:

T63

Records

Prior to this competition, the existing world, Paralympic, and area records were as follows:

Results

The final in this classification took place on 2 September 2021, at 19:00:

T64

Records

Prior to this competition, the existing world, Paralympic, and area records were as follows:

Results

The final in this classification took place on 28 August 2021, at 10:42:

References

Athletics at the 2020 Summer Paralympics
2021 in women's athletics